Walter Jacob Bernhardt (May 20, 1893 – July 26, 1958) was a Major League Baseball pitcher. Bernhardt played for the New York Yankees in the  season. In one game, he faced two batters, and struck out one of them, and he did not surrender a hit. He batted and threw right-handed.

He was born in Pleasant Village, Pennsylvania and died in Watertown, New York.

External links
Baseball Reference.com page

1893 births
1958 deaths
Baseball players from Pennsylvania
New York Yankees players
American dentists
University of Pennsylvania School of Dental Medicine alumni
Penn Quakers baseball players
United States Army personnel of World War I
Farmers from New York (state)